The M1947 Johnson auto carbine is a semi-automatic derivative of the M1941 Johnson machine gun. It was intended as a replacement of the M1 rifle but not accepted. The auto carbine never got past the prototype stage, with only five of them ever being made.

See also
 M1941 Johnson rifle
 Model 45A
 M1946 Sieg automatic rifle

References

.30-06 Springfield semi-automatic rifles
Abandoned military projects of the United States
Firearms by Melvin Johnson
Rifles of the United States
Trial and research firearms of the United States